Adderley is an English surname. Notable people with the surname include:

 Bill Adderley (born 1948), British businessman
 Cannonball Adderley (1928–1975), American jazz musician
 Charles Adderley (disambiguation), multiple people
 Herb Adderley (1939–2020), American football player
 Nasir Adderley (born 1997), American football player
 Nat Adderley (1931–2000), American jazz cornet and trumpet player
 Nat Adderley Jr. (born 1955), American music arranger and pianist
 Patrick Adderley (born 1948), Bahamian Anglican priest; Dean of Nassau
 Paul Adderley (1928–2012), Bahamian politician and lawyer
 Tommy Adderley (1940–1993), New Zealand singer

References 

English-language surnames